Ninderry is a rural town and locality in the Sunshine Coast Region, Queensland, Australia.

Geography 
The locality is bounded to the north-west by the Bruce Highway and the North Coast railway line and to the south-west by the North Maroochy River. The locality is loosely bounded to the east by the ridgeline of the Ninderry Range.

There are two mountains in the locality

 Mount Ninderry in the south-east corner of the locality rising to 
On the outskirts of Yandina, the land use is mostly rural residential but some areas are still used for agriculture.

History 
The town takes its name the from Ninderry Range. The name of the range is a corruption of the Kabi language word nyindur / durree, meaning  place of scrub leeches.

Education 
There are no schools in Ninderry. The nearest government primary schools are Yandina State School in neighbouring Yandina to the south-west and North Arm State School in neighbouring North Arm to the north. The nearest government secondary school is Nambour State College in Nambour to the south.

Community groups 
Maroochy Landcare and Maroochy Mooloola Catchment Coordinating Association are both based in Ninderry. Both are affiliated with Landcare Australia.

Parks 
There are a number of parks in the area:

 Collins Road Natural Amenity Reserve
 George Best Park
 Honeydew Place Natural Amenity Reserve
 Leach Park
 Mount Ninderry Bushland Conservation Reserve
 North Maroochy River Esplanade – Yandina
 Old Coach Way Bushland Conservation Reserve
 Old Coach Way Park

Attractions 

The bushwalk up Mount Ninderry has two lookouts with panoramic views east to Mount Coolum and west to Yandina.

References

External links

 

Suburbs of the Sunshine Coast Region
Localities in Queensland
Towns in Queensland